The Schoolridge Farm, also known as School House Ridge, is a historic home located at Upper Fairmount, Somerset County, Maryland, United States. It is a two-story two-bay side-hall / double pile Flemish bond brick house with a steeply pitched wood shingle roof, built about 1780.  Attached to the house is a one-story frame kitchen wing and -story, three-bay frame addition. Also on the property is a 19th-century frame smokehouse, modern utility building and a screened-in gazebo.

The Schoolridge Farm was listed on the National Register of Historic Places in 1984.

References

External links
, including photo from 1985, at Maryland Historical Trust

Houses in Somerset County, Maryland
Houses on the National Register of Historic Places in Maryland
Houses completed in 1780
National Register of Historic Places in Somerset County, Maryland